Amui may refer to:
 Amui, Kazerun
 Amui, Mamasani